The UK-US relations in World War II comprised an extensive and  highly complex relationships, in terms of diplomacy, military action, financing, and supplies. British Prime Minister Winston Churchill and American President Franklin D. Roosevelt formed close personal ties, that operated apart from their respective diplomatic and military organizations.

Leadership issues
While Franklin Roosevelt and Winston Churchill have thoroughly dominated the popular and scholarly writings, each stood atop a complex decision-making system that guaranteed inputs from military, diplomatic, business and public opinion.

In terms of foreign-policy, Roosevelt for years had developed a system whereby he made all the major decisions. Secretary of State, Cordell Hull was relegated to ceremonial roles. Secretary of the Treasury Henry Morgenthau, Jr. had the loudest voice in financial matters, and was deeply engaged in foreign policy, especially regarding Lend Lease, China, Jews and Germany. Although Roosevelt himself was quite pragmatic about moral issues, the image he presented to outsiders, especially the British, grated on their sensibilities. British foreign minister Anthony Eden told his war cabinet, "Soviet policy is amoral; United States policy is exaggeratedly moral, at least where non-American interests are concerned."

In military affairs, the Joint Chiefs of Staff was headed by Admiral William D. Leahy, a close personal friend of the president for decades. It dealt directly with their British counterparts in a new organization, the Combined Chiefs of Staff, which was based in Washington. Military decisions were made through the joint Chiefs and the combined chiefs, and they issued the orders to the theatre chiefs. The chiefs were in command of all Allied forces in their geographical zone. This was a new concept in military history, one promoted by General Marshall and accepted reluctantly at first by the British.  In terms of British-American  military teamwork, the key theaters were the Mediterranean and the West European – SHAEF. US general Dwight D. Eisenhower Headed the Mediterranean Theater 1943–44, then moved to SHAEF.

Historians have always paid special attention to the Roosevelt-Churchill friendship.  They also have explored how the two men dealt with Joseph Stalin, the Soviet dictator.  Roosevelt and Churchill met in person 11 times.  They exchanged 1700 cables and letters and they even made some international phone calls.  Roosevelt also sent top aides, especially Harry Hopkins and to a lesser extent W. Averell Harriman. Harriman accompanied Churchill to the Moscow Conference in 1942 to explain to Stalin why the western allies were carrying out operations in North Africa instead of opening the promised second front in France.  Harriman was appointed as Ambassador to the USSR in 1943.

Churchill ran a coalition government, with all parties represented. He dominated his War Cabinet.  Clement Attlee, the leader of the Labour party, was Deputy Prime Minister and handled practically all domestic affairs. He did so very quietly, usually backstage. Churchill, like Roosevelt, relied on charisma and a very strong public image, to rally public opinion.  Churchill handled all the top foreign policy decisions himself, with his Foreign Minister Anthony Eden taking charge only of lower visibility issues.  Churchill made himself Minister of Defence, And repeatedly interfered and reshaped and argued with his chiefs of staff.  Historians generally agree with the quality of Churchill's wartime leadership, often emphasizing his remarkable success in obtaining American support. Richard Wilkinson, who is more critical than most historians, nevertheless  argues:
No one else in Britain could have approached Churchill's achievement in winning the support of President Roosevelt and his fellow citizens....He displayed a profound and sincere admiration for America. His courtship of Roosevelt was a marvellous mixture of flattery, bonhomie, and the reiteration of those values which the USA and Great Britain shared and therefore of the threat which Nazism posed to both democracies. Churchill appealed to America's interests and to her sentiments.

The British sent two ambassadors to Washington; each achieved very positive reputations for handling American leaders and influencing American public opinion. Lord Lothian served in 1930–40. On his death Lord Halifax took charge, 1940–46. Halifax as Foreign Minister (1938–40) had been a leader of the appeasement movement before 1939, but then reversed himself and took an aggressive anti-Hitler position.  The US Ambassador 1938–40 Joseph P. Kennedy was a defeatist who in 1940 warned Roosevelt that Britain was doomed. Roosevelt could not remove Kennedy because he needed Irish support in the major cities in the 1940 election, Kennedy endorsed Roosevelt then retired, to be replaced by low-key Republican John Winant, who did well in London, 1941–46.

After the declarations of war, foreign-policy issues were no longer high on the political agenda. Appeasement was dead in Britain; isolationism was dead in the United States. After the U.S. entered the war in December 1941, foreign-policy was rarely discussed by Congress, and there was very little demand to cut Lend Lease spending. In spring 1944, the House passed a bill to renew the Lend Lease program by a vote of 334 to 21. The Senate passed it by a vote of 63 to 1.

Top level conferences

Atlantic Charter 1941
Roosevelt and Churchill met secretly at Placentia Bay in Newfoundland in August 1941, and issued a policy statement that became the foundation document for the Allies who later joined the war against Germany. A country had to join to gain admission to the United Nations. The Atlantic Charter defined the Allied goals for the post world war. The Charter stated the ideal goals of the war—no territorial aggrandizement; no territorial changes made against the wishes of the people, self-determination; restoration of self-government to those deprived of it; reduction of trade restrictions; global cooperation to secure better economic and social conditions for all; freedom from fear and want; freedom of the seas; and abandonment of the use of force, as well as disarmament of aggressor nations. Adherents of the Atlantic Charter signed the Declaration by United Nations on 1 January 1942, which became the basis for the modern United Nations.  The Charter was a powerful propaganda weapon, but Churchill, profoundly committed to maintaining British Empire, claimed it did not apply to British possessions. Churchill's insistence on full control was signaled when he did not bring along his foreign minister Anthony Eden.

Arcadia, 1941–1942

The Arcadia Conference was held in Washington, from December 22, 1941 to January 14, 1942, bringing together the top British and American military leaders. Churchill and Roosevelt and their aides had very candid conversations that led to a series of major decisions that shaped the war effort in 1942–1943. The decision was made to invade North Africa in 1942, to send American bombers to bases in England, and for the British to strengthen their forces in the Pacific. The Conference established the Combined Chiefs of Staff, headquartered in Washington, which approved and finalized all military decisions. It also created a unified American-British-Dutch-Australian Command (ABDA) in the Far East; it fared poorly. Finally the conference drafted the Declaration by United Nations, which committed the Allies to make no separate peace with the enemy, and to employ full resources until victory.

Quebec Conference, 1943
At the Quebec Conference, 1943 held in Canada in August 1943, Churchill, Roosevelt and the Combined Chiefs plotted strategy against Germany. They began planning the invasion of France, codenamed Overlord using a report by the Combined Chiefs. They also discussed an increase of the bombing offensive against facilities Germany was using in France and the Low Countries. They decided to continue the buildup of American forces in Britain prior to an invasion of France. Churchill kept drawing attention to the advantages of operations in the Mediterranean theatre. They agreed to use more force to force Italy out of the war, and to occupy it along with Corsica. Military cooperation was close and successful.  The Prime Minister of Canada was the host, but no Canadians attended the secret meetings.

Casablanca Conference 1943

From January 14–24, 1943 Roosevelt, Churchill and the Combined Staff met in Casablanca, Morocco. They decided on the major Allied strategy for 1943 in Europe, especially the invasion of Italy and planning for the invasion of France.   They blended British and American offensive concepts.  At Roosevelt's demand, they agreed on a policy of "unconditional surrender." This policy uplifted Allied morale, but it also made the Nazis resolve to fight to the bitter end. A major problem was to establish a working relationship between the two main French allies, Henri Giraud, the French high commissioner in North Africa, and General Charles de Gaulle, leader of the Free French.   Roosevelt strongly disliked de Gaulle, while Churchill championed him. The final decision was to split control of liberated French areas between the two Frenchmen. By 1944, de Gaulle prevailed, but he never forgave Roosevelt and always distrusted Anglo-Saxon collaboration as hostile to French interests.

Lend-Lease

The Americans spent about $50 billion on Lend Lease aid to the British Empire,  the Soviet Union, France, China, and some smaller countries. That amounted to about 11% of the cost of the war to the U.S.. It received back about $7.8 billion in goods and services provided by the recipients to the United States, especially the cost of rent for American installations abroad.  Lend Lease aid was usually not dollars that the recipient could use for any purpose.  Instead it was supplies and services counted by the dollar value of military and naval munitions as well as civilian supplies such as freighters, oil, food, chemicals, metals, machinery, rent and shipping services. The total given to the British Empire, 1940-45 was $30.0 billion.  This includes supplies to India, Australia, and the other dominions and colonies.  Russia received $10.7 billion, and all other countries $2.9 billion.  The question of repayment came up, and Roosevelt repeatedly insisted the United States did not want a postwar debt problem of the sort that had troubled relations after the first world war. A small fraction of goods that were still useful – such as merchant ships – were returned to the United States. The recipients provided bases and supplies to American forces on their own soil. The cost, including rents, was called "Reverse Lend Lease", that is, aid given to the United States. It came to $7.8 billion overall, of which 86% came from the British Empire.  Canada operated a similar program on behalf of Great Britain, and Britain itself operated a similar one for the Soviet Union.  In terms of repaying Washington after the war ended,  the policy became one of fair shares.  In the end,  no one paid for the goods it received, although they did pay for goods in transit that were received after  the program ended . Roosevelt told Congress in June 1942:

See also

 Allied technological cooperation during World War II
 British Army during the Second World War
 British Empire in World War II
 Destroyers for Bases Agreement
 Diplomatic history of World War II
 History of the Royal Air Force
 History of the Royal Navy
 Lend-Lease
 Military production during World War II
 Timeline of British diplomatic history
 Timeline of United States diplomatic history
 United Kingdom–United States relations

Notes

Further reading
 Abramson, Rudy. Spanning the Century: The Life of W. Averell Harriman, 1891–1986 (1992)
 Alldritt, Keith. The greatest of friends: Franklin D. Roosevelt and Winston Churchill, 1941–1945 (1995) online free
 Allen, H. C. Great Britain and the United States: A History of Anglo-American Relations, 1783–1952 (1954), pp. 781–885. online
 Allen, R.G.D. "Mutual Aid between the U.S. and the British Empire, 1941–5", in Journal of the Royal Statistical Society no. 109 #3, 1946. pp. 243–277 in JSTOR  detailed statistical data on Lend Lease
 Barker, Elisabeth. Churchill & Eden at War (1979) 346p.
 Beitzell, Robert. The uneasy alliance; America, Britain, and Russia, 1941–1943 (1972)  online free
 Bercuson, David Jay, and Holger H. Herwig. One Christmas in Washington: Roosevelt and Churchill forge the grand alliance (2006), December Arcadia 1941 meeting online free
 
 Burns, James Macgregor. Roosevelt – The Soldier Of Freedom – 1940–1945 (1970)
 Charmly, John. Churchill's Grand Alliance: The Anglo-American Special Relationship 1940–57 (1996) 
 
 Clarke, Sir Richard. Anglo-American Economic Collaboration in War and Peace, 1942–1949. (1982), British perspective
 
 Dallek, Robert. Franklin D. Roosevelt and American Foreign Policy, 1932–1945 (1979) the standard scholarly study online   also online free complete copy
 Dawson, Raymond H. The Decision to Aid Russia, 1941: Foreign Policy and Domestic Politics (1959)
 Dobson, Alan P. U.S. Wartime Aid to Britain, 1940–1946 London, 1986. 
 Edmonds, Robin. The big three : Churchill, Roosevelt, and Stalin in peace & war (1991) online free
 Gilbert,  Martin. Churchill and America (2005)  online free
 
 Herring Jr. George C. Aid to Russia, 1941–1946: Strategy, Diplomacy, the Origins of the Cold War (1973) online edition 
 Groom, Winston. The Allies: Churchill, Roosevelt, Stalin, and the Unlikely Alliance That Won World War II (2018), Popular overview
 Kimball, Warren F. "Franklin D. Roosevelt and World War II," Presidential Studies Quarterly Vol. 34#1 (2004) pp 83+.
 Kimball, Warren F. Forged in War: Roosevelt, Churchill, and the Second World War (1997)  excerpt
 Kimball, Warren F. The Most Unsordid Act: Lend-Lease, 1939–1941 (1969).
 Kimball, Warren, ed. Churchill & Roosevelt: The Complete Correspondence (3v. 1987) 2200pp
 
 Lash, Joseph P. Roosevelt and Churchill, 1939–1941: the partnership that saved the West (1976) online free
 Leutze, James R. Bargaining for Supremacy: Anglo-American Naval Collaboration, 1937–1941  (1977) online 
 Louis, William Roger. Imperialism at Bay: The United States and the Decolonization of the British Empire, 1941–1945. (1977).
 McNeill, William Hardy. America, Britain and Russia: Their Cooperation and Conflict 1941–1946 (1953), in-depth scholarly coverage; 805pp 
 Miner, Steven M. Between Churchill and Stalin: The Soviet Union, Great Britain, and the Origins of the Grand Alliance (2017).
 O'Sullivan, Christopher.  Harry Hopkins: FDR's Envoy to Churchill and Stalin. (Rowman and Littlefield 2014)
 Pederson, William D. ed. A Companion to Franklin D. Roosevelt (2011) online  pp 493–516, covers FDR's policies
 Reynolds, David. From World War to Cold War: Churchill, Roosevelt, and the International History of the 1940s (2007) excerpt and text search
 Reynolds, David. The Creation of the Anglo-American Alliance 1937–1941: A Study on Competitive Cooperation (1981)
 Roberts, Andrew. Masters and Commanders: How Four Titans won the war in the West, 1941–1945 (2009) excerpt
 Roberts, Andrew. The Holy Fox: The Life of Lord Halifax (1997) British ambassador to US, 1940– 
 Roll, David.  The Hopkins Touch: Harry Hopkins and the Forging of the Alliance to Defeat Hitler (2012)  excerpt and text search and author webcast presentation
  Sainsbury, Keith. Turning Point: Roosevelt, Stalin, Churchill & Chiang-Kai-Shek, 1943: The Moscow, Cairo & Teheran Conferences (1985) 373 pp 
 Sherwood, Robert E. Roosevelt and Hopkins (1948), memoir by senior FDR aide; Pulitzer Prize. online complete edition
 Shortal, John F. Code Name Arcadia: The First Wartime Conference of Churchill and Roosevelt (Texas A&M University Press, 2021). 
 Stafford, David. Roosevelt and Churchill: Men of Secrets (2011)  excerpts
 Tuttle, Dwight William. Harry L. Hopkins and Anglo-American-Soviet Relations, 1941–1945 (1983) 
 Weinberg, Gerhard L. A World at Arms: A Global History of World War II (1994) online free
 Wilson, Theodore A. The First Summit: Roosevelt and Churchill at Placentia Bay, 1941 (1991)  excerpt
 Woods, Randall Bennett. A Changing of the Guard: Anglo-American Relations, 1941–1946 (1990) 
 Woodward, Llewellyn. British Foreign Policy in the Second World War (1962); 585 pages; abridged version of his monumental five-volume history; online copies
 Robert F. Worth, "The End of the Show" (review of James Barr, Lords of the Desert: The Battle Between the United States and Great Britain for Supremacy in the Modern Middle East, Basic Books, 454 pp.; and Derek Leebaert, Grand Improvisation: America Confronts the British Superpower, 1945–1957, Farrar, Straus and Giroux, 612 pp.), The New York Review of Books, vol. LXVI, no. 16 (24 October 2019), pp. 44–46.

Primary sources
 Churchill, Winston. The Second World War (6-vol 1948–40) very famous 6 volume history focused on Churchill's role; includes many documents; online
 Harriman, W. Averell and Abel, Elie. Special Envoy to Churchill and Stalin, 1941–1946. (1975). 595 pp.
 Hull, Cordell. The Memoirs of Cordell Hull (2 vol 1948), the U.S. Secretary of State 
 Loewenheim, Francis L. et al. eds. Roosevelt and Churchill, their secret wartime correspondence (1975), Abbreviated edition, 800pp  online 
 Kimball, Warren, ed. Churchill & Roosevelt: The Complete Correspondence (3v. 1987) 2200pp 
 Nicholas, H.G. ed., Washington Despatches, 1941–45: Weekly Political Reports from the British Embassy (1981).  700pp; in-depth reports on US politics by Isaiah Berlin 

 
Bilateral relations of the United States
United States
United Kingdom in World War II
United States in World War II